The 2012 United States Senate election in New Mexico took place on November 6, 2012, concurrently with the 2012 U.S. presidential election as well as other elections to the United States Senate and House of Representatives as well as various state and local elections. Incumbent Democratic U.S. Senator Jeff Bingaman decided to retire instead of running for reelection to a sixth term.  Democratic U.S. Representative Martin Heinrich won the open seat.

Background 
Incumbent Jeff Bingaman won re-election to a fifth term with 70.61% of the vote against Allen McCulloch in the 2006 U.S. senatorial election in New Mexico.

Democratic primary

Candidates

Declared 
 Hector Balderas, state Auditor
 Martin Heinrich, U.S. Representative

Withdrew 
 Martin Chávez, former Albuquerque mayor and 1998 Democratic gubernatorial nominee (withdrew to run for U.S. House)
 Andres Valdez, anti-police brutality Social Justice activist

Declined 
 Jeff Bingaman, incumbent U.S. senator
 Diane Denish, former New Mexico lieutenant governor and 2010 Democratic gubernatorial nominee
 Ben Ray Luján, U.S. representative

Polling

Endorsements

Results

Republican primary

Candidates

Declared 
 Greg Sowards, businessman
 Heather Wilson, former U.S. Representative and candidate for the U.S. Senate in 2008

Withdrew 
 Bill English, businessman
 John Sanchez, Lieutenant Governor of New Mexico an nominee for Governor in 2002

Declined 
 Janice Arnold-Jones, former state representative
 Gary Johnson, former governor (ran for President)
 Steve Pearce, U.S. Representative, candidate for the U.S. Senate in 2000, and nominee for the U.S. Senate in 2008

Polling

Endorsements

Results

General election

Candidates 
 Martin Heinrich (D), U.S. Representative
 Heather Wilson (R), former U.S. Representative and candidate for the U.S. Senate in 2008
 Jon Barrie (Independent American Party), alternative medicine practitioner and Air Force veteran

Debates
Complete video of debate, October 17, 2012 - C-SPAN
Complete video of debate, October 25, 2012 - C-SPAN

Fundraising

Top contributors

Top industries

Predictions

Polling 

with Jeff Bingaman

with Hector Balderas

with Ben Ray Luján

with Martin Heinrich

Results

See also 
 2012 United States Senate elections
 2012 United States House of Representatives elections in New Mexico

References

External links 
 Elections from the New Mexico secretary of state
 Financial information from OpenSecrets.org
 Outside spending at Sunlight Foundation
 Candidate issue positions at On the Issues

Official campaign websites (Archived)
 Jon Barrie for U.S. Senate
 Martin Heinrich for U.S. Senate
 Heather Wilson for U.S. Senate

New Mexico
2012
United States Senate